NYJPN is a 2014 album by Ron Anderson, Tatsuya Yoshida, and Nonoko Yoshida, under the name PAK. Popdose says "the brunt of the disc is composed of jagged-edge jazz, played in complicated times, with blasts of sax reminiscent of John Zorn".

Track listing
1. Fail Better 2:39
2. Criterium Crash 0:45
3. L'enfer Du Nord 4:53
4. Breakaway 1:39
5. Road Rash 5:08
6. Spinning 1:02
7. Mama's Little Anarchist 2:21
8. Carbon Death Ride 0:58
9. EPO 4:38
10. Putting The Hammer Down 1:55
11. Attack, Attack 6:46
12. Hold The Line 0:57
13. Super Combatif 8:25

References

2014 albums